Dan Weiner (1919–1959) was an American photojournalist, working largely for Fortune magazine. Weiner specialized in photographs of America at work.

Life and work
He was born in New York City. He studied painting at the Art Students League and the Pratt Institute, and eventually turned to photography, becoming a member of the Photo League.

Weiner served in the Army Air Forces during World War II, and became a professional photojournalist after the war, working largely for Fortune magazine. He made street photographs of mid-20th-century New York City.

He died in a plane crash in Kentucky, aged 39. The plane, piloted by the subject of one of his stories, collided with the side of a mountain during a freak snowstorm.

He was married to Sandra Weiner, who he met through the Photo League as her teacher.

Publications
 Capa, Cornell, ed. (1968). The Concerned Photographer. New York: Grossman. With photographs by Weiner, Werner Bischof, André Kertész, Robert Capa, Leonard Freed, and David Seymour.
 Capa, Cornell, ed. (1974). Dan Weiner. ICP Library of Photographers, vol. 5. New York: Grossman. ; .
 Ewing, William A. (1989). America Worked: The 1950s Photographs of Dan Weiner. New York: Harry N. Abrams. .
 Paton, Alan (1956). South Africa in Transition. New York: Scribner. Photographs by Weiner.

Collections
Weiner's work is held in the following permanent collection:
Metropolitan Museum of Art, New York: 15 prints (as of August 2020)

References

1919 births
1959 deaths
Victims of aviation accidents or incidents in the United States
American photojournalists
Pratt Institute alumni
Art Students League of New York alumni
Journalists from New York City
Accidental deaths in Kentucky
20th-century American photographers
20th-century American journalists
American male journalists
United States Army Air Forces personnel of World War II
Street photographers